Existence, a philosophical concept in metaphysics and ontology.

Existence may also refer to:
 Existence (Dark Suns album)
 Existence (Beto Vázquez Infinity album)
 "Existence" (The X-Files), a 2001 television episode
 eXistenZ, a 1999 horror science-fiction film
 The Existence, a 2004 EP release by Forever Changed
 Existence, David Brin novel
 The 14, a 1973 British film also released as Existence and The Wild Little Bunch
 Existence, is the name of a music project founded by Margot Reisinger 

Existential can mean "relating to existence" or "relating to existentialism". It is used in particular to refer to:
Existential quantification, in logic and mathematics (symbolized by ∃)
Existential clause, in linguistics
Existential crisis
Existential fallacy
Existential humanism
Existential forgery
Existential risk
Existential therapy
Existential graph
Existential phenomenology

See also

Exist (disambiguation)